The 2009 Mountain West Conference football season was the 11th since eight former members of the Western Athletic Conference banded together to form the MW.

Previous season
Utah won its fourth conference championship while being the only Division I team to go undefeated.

Rankings

Mountain West vs. BCS matchups

Bowl games

Home attendance

References